Marina High School may refer to:
 Marina High School (Huntington Beach, California)
 Marina High School (Marina, California)
 Marina High School (San Leandro, California)